The Anartes (or Anarti, Anartii or Anartoi) were Celtic tribes, or, in the case of those sub-groups of Anartes which penetrated the ancient region of Dacia (roughly modern Romania), Celts culturally assimilated by the Dacians.

Ptolemy's Geographia locates the Anartoi in the north of Dacia. Some groups of Anartes occupied parts of modern Slovakia and southeastern Poland.

The Dacian town of Docidava was situated in the territory of the Anartes, according to Pârvan.

The Anartophracti (or Anartofraktoi) are mentioned by Ptolemy. This tribe's name appears to be compound Latin-Greek name and may be related to the Anartoi resident in Dacia, Czarnecki argues. The Anartofraktoi were a northern Dacian tribe, according to Braune or mixed Dacian-Celtic, according to Pârvan.

In ancient sources, the earliest mention of the Anartes is in the Elogium of Tusculum (10 BC).

In De Bello Gallico, an account of his own campaigns in the Gallic Wars (58-51 BC), Julius Caesar wrote (VI.25.1-2): The breadth of this Hercynian forest, which has been referred to above, is to a quick traveler, a journey of nine days. For it can not be otherwise computed, nor are they acquainted with the measures of roads. It begins at the frontiers of the Helvetii, Nemetes, and Rauraci, and extends in a right line along the river Danube to the territories of the Daci and the Anartes.Around AD 172, the Anartes refused to assist the Romans in their war against the Marcomanni. To punish them, the Roman emperor Marcus Aurelius ordered the deportation of (all?) the Anartes from their native homelands to the Roman province of Pannonia Inferior, a movement which took place not later than AD 180.

Archaeological evidence 

The Anartes were probably identical with, or constituted a significant part of, the archaeological Púchov culture in Slovakia, which included the centres of Zemplín, Bükkszentlászló in Hungary and Galish-Lovačka in Ukraine
During the late La Tène period, mixed settlements of Celts and Dacians spread over the eastern Slovak lowlands with Zemplin at its center, according to Husovska. According to Ioana Oltean, archaeological excavation has revealed that some Celtic tribes (Anartes, Teurisci) had migrated eastwards as far as Transylvania, where they were eventually assimilated by the Dacians. Even though some groups of Anartes advanced as far as the Transylvanian plateau, the main area of their domination was to the West of it, Macrea & Filip argue.

Sources
 Archeologie Barbaru. 2005, [in:] Ján Beljak. Puchowska kultura a Germani na pohroni v starsej dobe rimskej. pp. 257–272
 The Works of Tacitus. by Alfred John Church and William Jackson Brodribb
 Czarnecki Jan (1975) "The Goths in ancient Poland: a study on the historical geography of the Oder-Vistula region during the first two centuries of our era, University of Miami Press"
 Macrea and Filip Jan (1970) "Actes du VIIe Congrés International des Sciences Prehistoriques et Protohistoriques", Prague published by the "Institut d'Archéologie de l'Académie" Prague
 Oltean Ioana A (2007) Dacia: Landscape, Colonization and Romanization, 2007
 Schutte, Gudmund (1917) Ptolemy's maps of northern Europe: a reconstruction of the prototypes, (1 ed.),  publisher H. Hagerup

Notes

Ancient Slovakia
Historical Celtic peoples
Dacian tribes
Prehistoric Poland
Ancient tribes in Dacia